Association Sportive de Pikine or simply AS Pikine is a Senegalese football club based in Pikine. They play at Stade Alassane Djigo, which has a capacity of 5,000.

History
The earlier club was established in 1921 and was called Niayes-Pikine.

The modern club was established in 1970, first known as ASC Niayes-Pikine up to the 2000s.  AS Pikine entered Ligue 1 in 2009.  They would win their first national championship and cup title at the same time for the 2013/14 season and headed to participate in the CAF Champions league in 2015 and challenged Étoile Filante de Ouagadougou, a club from Burkina Faso and later into the first round where they lost to USM Algiers from Algeria.

In the 2014-15 season, Pikine did not have a successful season, their continued appearance in Ligue 1 vanished after being inside the relegation zone and placed 13th after ASC Port Autonome with 28 points, 4 wins and a staggering 14 losses.

Pikine first appeared in the 2009 edition, the club came in 2011 and won their only League Cup title after defeating Yakaar 2-1.  Their second attempt for their second title vanished after the club lost to Niarry Tally 1-0 in the 2012 league cup season.

Achievements
Senegal Premier League: 1
 2014.

Senegal FA Cup: 1
 2014.

Coupe de la Ligue: 1
 2011.

Coupe de l'Assemblée Nationale du Sénégal: 0

Trophée des Champions du Sénégal: 1
 2014.

Super Coupe du Sénégal: 0

Senegal Second League (Ligue 2): 1
 2009

League and cup history

Performance in CAF competitions

National level

as Niayes-Pikine

as AS Pikine

Statistics
Best position: First Round (continental)
Best position at a cup competition: 1st (national)
Best position at the League Cup: 1st
Appearances at the League Cup: 9
Highest number of points in a season: 49 (national)

References

External links
Team profile - Soccerway.com

 
Football clubs in Senegal
Ligue 2 (Senegal) clubs
Association football clubs established in 1921
AS Pikine
AS Pikine
AS Pikine